{{DISPLAYTITLE:Tau3 Gruis}}

Tau3 Gruis is a solitary star in the southern constellation of Grus. Its apparent magnitude is 5.71, which is bright enough to be visible to the naked eye as a dim, white-hued star. The star is located around  distant from the Sun based on parallax, and it is drifting further away with a radial velocity of 6 km/s.

This is an Am star with a stellar classification of kA5hA7mF2. This notation indicates the spectrum displays the calcium K-line of an A5 star, the hydrogen lines of an A7 star, and the metal lines of an F2 star. It has 2.9 times the Sun's radius and is radiating 27 times the luminosity of the Sun from its photosphere at an effective temperature of around 7,735 K.

References

A-type main-sequence stars
Am stars

Grus (constellation)
Gruis, Tau3
Durchmusterung objects
216823
113307
8722